Baldev Ram Mirdha Institute of Technology, commonly referred to as BMIT, Jaipur, is a private research college located in Jaipur, Rajasthan, India. BMIT is approved by the All India Council for Technical Education and affiliated with the Rajasthan Technical University. It enrolls approximately 3,125 undergraduate and 241 graduate students from India and around the world.

History 
It was founded in 2003 by Choudhary Mularam Memorial Educational Society, and named after Baldev Ram Mirdha. BMIT started in a small building constructed in the Sitapura Industrial Area on the outskirts of Jaipur. It had four Bachelor of Engineering streams: [Information Technology],[Computer science], Electronics & Communication, and Electrical. It later added Civil engineering and Mechanical Engineering programs in another campus called BMIT East. It built its East Campus in 2007.

BMIT Campus

Digital Electronics Lab
Electronic Measurement and Instrumentation Lab
Microprocessor Lab
Communication Lab
Electrical Lab
Chemistry Lab
Physics Lab
Engineering Workshop
Computer Hardware Lab
Microwave Lab
Electronics Lab
Electrical Machines Lab
Power Generation Lab
Power Systems Lab
Antenna Lab
CAD Lab etc...

References
Business India Magazine. November 2009. Business Schools Survey
CNN iReport. ECONS Education Excellence Award-2014
BMIT Jaipur Official Website
BMIT on Wiki Maps
CNN iReport 2009
CITRONICS-2014 Champion Details
Fox News Report 2014
Affiliated from RTU, Kota
Digital Journal Blog
EETP Program by BSNL
Approved Colleges from AICTE, New Delhi
BMIT Alexa Website Ranking 

Universities and colleges in Jaipur